This is the discography of former British-American pop singer Tracey Ullman. Known mainly for her work in television and film, she had a brief career as a successful pop singer. She was signed to Stiff Records in 1983 after label owner Dave Robinson heard some of the song parodies she did in her early television work. Her albums consisted mainly of cover versions of songs from the 1950s through the early 1980s.

Her cover of the Kirsty Maccoll song "They Don't Know" would go on to become her most successful single, reaching #2 in the UK, #8 in the United States, and #35 in Germany. In less than two years, she had six songs in the UK Top 100. After the release of her second album, You Caught Me Out in 1984, she decided to leave her music career behind and focus on acting.

Albums

Studio albums

Compilation albums

Soundtrack albums

Comedy albums

Audiobooks

Singles

Music videos

References

Discographies of British artists
Discographies of American artists
Pop music discographies
Tracey Ullman